Jordan Stewart may refer to:

 Jordan Stewart (footballer, born 1982), English footballer
 Jordan Stewart (footballer, born 1995), Northern Irish footballer
 Jordan Stewart (footballer, born 1996), Scottish footballer
 Jordan Stewart (speedway rider) (born 1998), Australian speedway rider
 Jordan Stewart (taekwondo) (born 1996), Canadian taekwondo practitioner
 Jordan Stewart, keyboardist with Emarosa
 Jordan R. Stewart (born 1845) American politician